is a Japanese manga artist who is the author and artist of sports manga. He is best known for the Sumo series Ucchare Goshogawara, for which he received the 1989 Shogakukan Manga Award in shōnen category. and which got an OVA adaptation in 1991. Between 1999 and 2011, his golf manga The Golden Rough (Ougon no Rough ~Sōta no Stance~) was released in 33 tankōbon volumes.

Nakaima was an avid baseball player throughout high school and college but had to quit after shoulder injury. He became an assistant to Akio Chiba before creating manga on his own.  
Nakaima is from Okinawa and it has been noted how some of his character use Okinawan Japanese.

Selected works
  - Monthly Shōnen Jump - 58 volumes - baseball
  - Weekly Shōnen Sunday - 12 volumes - sumo
  - Big Comic - 33 volumes - professional golf
  - Weekly Morning - 16 volumes - women's boxing
  - Big Comic - professional golf

References

External links 
 

1960 births
Manga artists from Okinawa Prefecture
Living people
People from Okinawa Prefecture
Ryukyuan people